Castru Valnera (Cantabrian) or Castro Valnera (Spanish) is a peak located in the central area of the Cantabrian Mountains, in Burgos, northern Spain. It is around it that the whole Pas valley revolves, and also the source of the Miera River, between the Portillo de Lunada and Estacas de Trueba passes. 

Castru in Cantabrian refers to an abrupt rocky peak.

References

External links
Fansite of Speleology in Castro Valnera

Mountains of Cantabria
One-thousanders of Spain